The Maldon Mud Race is an annual fun race held in spring (originally in the winter, now in late April or early May) at Promenade Park in Maldon, Essex, England, in which entrants compete to complete a  dash, in thick mud, over the bed of the River Blackwater. The race is organised by the Lions & Rotary clubs of Maldon and Maldon District Council which raises money for charity.

History
The Maldon mud race began in 1973 when a regular at a local pub was challenged to serve a meal on the riverbank dressed in a dinner jacket. The challenge evolved into a race across the river to a waiting barrel of beer, drinking a pint of beer there and racing back. The barrel of beer has long disappeared and the race has become a charity event, with many participants wearing fancy dress. The event is watched by thousands of spectators and raises tens of thousands of pounds for charity. The 2010 race postponed from December until Easter 2011, because of extreme cold weather and later that year it was announced that the race would switch permanently from winter to spring. Brian Farrington, from the Rotary Club of Maldon, said: "It doesn't make any difference in regard to the race itself, because people still get covered in mud. ... Our main concern is health and safety and then how much money we can raise for charity."

The race can only take place when the tide is low enough to allow participants to cross the river safely. Participants start from one bank and make their way to the other side, negotiate 200 metres of mud along the river and then return to the original river bank. In 2009, the race was run twice, on 4 January and 27 December, after the 2008 event was postponed due to high tides. About 250 competitors took part in the December 2009 event and it has increased in size every year since.

In 2014 the race was held on 26 May and once again attracted hundreds of competitors.

The latest race took place on Sunday 1 May 2016.

References

External links
Maldon Mud Race website

Maldon, Essex
Charity events in the United Kingdom
Novelty running
Annual events in England
Events in Essex
1973 establishments in England
Recurring events established in 1973